Melissa Sanders may refer to:

Melissa Sanders, character played by Amy Irving in "The Theatre" for Rod Serling's Lost Classics
Melissa Sanders, character played by Ashley Holliday on Hollywood Heights (TV series)
Melissa Sanders, subject of an investigation by The Smoking Gun of James Frey's memoir A Million Little Pieces
Melissa Sanders (victim) (died 1992), American murder victim